"Rose" is the eighth single by Versailles. It was released on July 4, 2012, in commemoration of their fifth anniversary. The single includes a Japanese-language recording of "Love Will Be Born Again", taken from their third album Holy Grail, while the fourth song, "The Red Carpet Day", is a rerecording from their debut EP Lyrical Sympathy.

Track listing

References

Versailles (band) songs
2012 singles
Songs written by Hizaki
2012 songs
Songs written by Kamijo (musician)
Warner Music Japan singles